Spring Valley, Arkansas may refer to:

Spring Valley, Lonoke County, Arkansas
Spring Valley, Pulaski County, Arkansas
Spring Valley, Washington County, Arkansas   

or

Valley Springs, Arkansas